Wells is an unincorporated community in Orangeburg County, South Carolina, United States. Wells is located at the junction of U.S. Route 15 and U.S. Route 176, northwest of Holly Hill.

References

Unincorporated communities in Orangeburg County, South Carolina
Unincorporated communities in South Carolina